The 1999–00 season was Swansea City A.F.C.'s 80th season in the English football league system, in this season Swansea finished 1st in the 3rd division with a total of 85 points from 46 games. It was also memorable for the fastest red card for a player in Swansea's history as Walter Boyd was red carded after coming on as a substitute in the second half against Darlington at Vetch Field and was sent off before play had restarted from the same free kick that allowed him to be substituted on in the first place.

First-team squad
Squad at end of season

Final league table

References

1999
1999–2000 Football League Third Division by team
Welsh football clubs 1999–2000 season